The 1994 Rhode Island gubernatorial election took place on November 8, 1994. Republican Lincoln Almond defeated Democrat Myrth York.

Almond was the first governor elected to a four-year term, as opposed to two years.

Democratic primary

Candidates
Myrth York, former Rhode Island State Senator
Bruce Sundlun, incumbent Governor of Rhode Island
Louise Durfee, former Director of the Rhode Island Department of Environmental Management, former Tiverton city councilwoman
Donald Gill

Results

Republican primary

Candidates
Lincoln Almond, former U.S. Attorney for the District of Rhode Island
Ronald Machtley, U.S. Representative

Results

Independents
 Robert J. Healey, businessman

General election

Polling

Election results

References

1994
Rhode Island
Gubernatorial